Hankinson is a city in Richland County, North Dakota, United States. The population was 921 at the 2020 census. Hankinson was founded in 1886. It is part of the Wahpeton, ND–MN Micropolitan Statistical Area.

History
A post office has been in operation at Hankinson since 1886. The city was named after R. H. Hankinson, a local land owner.

Geography
Hankinson is located at  (46.070364, -96.901477).

Demographics

2010 census
As of the census of 2010, there were 919 people, 406 households, and 228 families living in the city. The racial makeup of the city was 93.8% White, 3.7% Native American, 0.1% Pacific Islander, 0.5% from other races, and 1.8% from two or more races. Hispanic or Latino of any race were 2.8% of the population.

There were 406 households, of which 23.4% had children under the age of 18 living with them, 44.1% were married couples living together, 8.1% had a female householder with no husband present, 3.9% had a male householder with no wife present, and 43.8% were non-families. 36.9% of all households were made up of individuals, and 18% had someone living alone who was 65 years of age or older. The average household size was 2.12 and the average family size was 2.79.

The median age in the city was 48.2 years. 20.6% of residents were under the age of 18; 5.1% were between the ages of 18 and 24; 20.1% were from 25 to 44; 27.4% were from 45 to 64; and 26.8% were 65 years of age or older. The gender makeup of the city was 49.7% male and 50.3% female.

2000 census
As of the census of 2000, there were 1,058 people, 454 households, and 261 families living in the city. The racial makeup of the city was 95.18% White, 3.21% Native American, 0.09% Asian, 0.19% Pacific Islander, and 1.32% from two or more races. Hispanic or Latino of any race were 1.51% of the population.

There were 454 households, out of which 25.1% had children under the age of 18 living with them, 47.4% were married couples living together, 7.7% had a female householder with no husband present, and 42.3% were non-families. 39.4% of all households were made up of individuals, and 25.3% had someone living alone who was 65 years of age or older. The average household size was 2.14 and the average family size was 2.87.

In the city, the population was spread out, with 21.6% under the age of 18, 6.0% from 18 to 24, 21.3% from 25 to 44, 20.3% from 45 to 64, and 30.9% who were 65 years of age or older. The median age was 46 years. For every 100 females, there were 83.0 males. For every 100 females age 18 and over, there were 76.2 males.

The median income for a household in the city was $28,125, and the median income for a family was $39,500. Males had a median income of $29,417 versus $17,955 for females. The per capita income for the city was $15,676. About 6.2% of families and 12.1% of the population were below the poverty line, including 7.8% of those under age 18 and 19.9% of those age 65 or over.

Climate
This climatic region is typified by large seasonal temperature differences, with warm to hot (and often humid) summers and cold (sometimes severely cold) winters.  According to the Köppen Climate Classification system, Hankinson has a humid continental climate, abbreviated "Dfb" on climate maps.

See also
 List of cities in North Dakota

References

External links

 Hankinson, North Dakota: community fact survey (1964) from the Digital Horizons website

Cities in North Dakota
Cities in Richland County, North Dakota
Populated places established in 1886
Wahpeton micropolitan area
1886 establishments in Dakota Territory